Curciat-Dongalon is a commune in the Ain department in eastern France.

Geography
The Sâne Morte forms part of the commune's north-eastern border. The Sâne Vive flows northward through the middle of the commune.

Population

See also
Communes of the Ain department

References

Communes of Ain
Ain communes articles needing translation from French Wikipedia
Bresse